Nobody is a 2021 American action thriller film directed by Ilya Naishuller and written by Derek Kolstad. The film, which stars Bob Odenkirk, Connie Nielsen, Aleksey Serebryakov, RZA, and Christopher Lloyd, follows a mild-mannered family man who, after his house is robbed, returns to his dangerous former life, making him the target of a vengeful crime lord. Odenkirk and David Leitch are among the film's producers.

Universal Pictures released Nobody theatrically in the United States on March 26, 2021, and in the United Kingdom on June 9, 2021. The film has grossed $57 million worldwide and received generally positive reviews from critics, who praised the action sequences and Odenkirk's performance. A sequel is in development.

Plot
Hutch Mansell leads an ordinary life, having two children with his wife Becca and an unremarkable office job in his father-in-law Eddie's metal fabrication company. His marriage is strained, and his working life seems tedious.

One night, an armed man and woman break into his house, and his teenage son, Blake, tackles the man and puts him in a headlock. Hutch prepares to attack the woman with a golf club, but relents and pleads with his son to release the man, who punches the boy. The thieves leave, but the incident causes everyone to think he is a failure. Hutch contacts his brother, Harry, on a hidden radio in his office and explains that he held back because the burglars were desperate, scared, and using an unloaded gun. Later that day, his daughter, Abby, asks for help finding her missing kitty cat bracelet. Without a word, Hutch leaves to see his father, David, and borrows his father's old FBI badge and gun to track down the burglars. He finds their apartment and threatens them, but soon discovers their sick baby, and leaves.

Some thugs stop the bus he takes home, and Hutch, looking for an opportunity to release his frustration, beats them under the pretense of protecting a young woman from sexual harassment. At home, he realizes he hasn't been communicating with his family and tries to reconnect with them. Harry persuades him to see "The Barber", who provides Hutch with information about one of his victims: he is the younger brother of Yulian Kuznetsov, a Russian crime lord. In retribution, Yulian sends a crew led by his right-hand man Pavel to capture Hutch at home. Hutch hides his family and kills most of the attackers before Pavel tases him into unconsciousness and captures him. Finding a fire extinguisher in the trunk of a car he is locked in, Hutch uses it to blind the driver, causing the car to crash, killing Pavel and his remaining crew. 

Hutch sends his family to safety before setting his house on fire to destroy any evidence. Hutch reveals that he is a former "auditor" ("the last guy any organization wants to see at their door"), an assassin employed by intelligence agencies. After letting one of his targets go free, Hutch found him a year later, reformed and happily living with his new family. Wanting a similar life, Hutch retired, against the wishes of his superiors. After buying Eddie's company with a stash of gold bars, Hutch burns the obshchak money that Yulian was protecting for the mob, along with Yulian's art collection. After coming to Yulian with an offer to stop the fighting, Hutch is pursued by him and his men, luring them to the factory, where David and Harry show up to help eliminate the gangsters. Using a variety of weapons and deadly traps that Hutch had set up, they kill all the gunmen until only Yulian is left.

Out of ammunition, Hutch charges Yulian with a Claymore mine attached to a pane of bulletproof glass and detonates it, killing the Russian mobster. After ensuring that his father and brother escape, Hutch is arrested before his police interrogators are notified, to their surprise, that he should be released with no charges filed. Three months later, while buying a new house with Becca, Hutch receives a call suggesting that his services are still required. In a mid-credits scene, Harry and David are shown driving to an undisclosed location in an RV filled with guns.

Cast

 Bob Odenkirk as Hutch Mansell / “Nobody”, a former government assassin for “those three letter agencies”
 Aleksei Serebryakov as Yulian Kuznetsov, a Russian mafia boss guarding obshchak, who is targeting Hutch and his family
 Connie Nielsen as Becca Mansell, Hutch's successful wife
 Christopher Lloyd as David Mansell, Hutch's father and a retired FBI agent
 Michael Ironside as Eddie Williams, Hutch's father-in-law and boss
 Colin Salmon as The Barber, Hutch's former government handler
 RZA as Harry Mansell, Hutch's brother
 Billy MacLellan as Charlie Williams, Eddie's son and Hutch's brother-in-law
 Gage Munroe as Blake Mansell, Hutch's teenage son
 Paisley Cadorath as Abby Mansell, Hutch's daughter
 Aleksandr Pal as Teddy Kuznetsov, Yulian's younger brother
 Araya Mengesha as Pavel, Yulian's half-Russian half-Ethiopian bodyguard

In addition Daniel Bernhardt and Alain Moussi play two of the Russian goons on the bus. J. P. Manoux appears as a Pentagon employee whom Yulian blackmails.

Production
In January 2018, it was announced Bob Odenkirk was set to star in the film, with Ilya Naishuller directing from a screenplay by Derek Kolstad. Odenkirk also served as a producer, alongside David Leitch. Kolstad executive produced, along with Marc S. Fischer, Annie Marter and Tobey Maguire. STX Entertainment was set to distribute the film. In April 2019, Universal Pictures acquired distribution rights to the film from STX. In October 2019, Connie Nielsen and Christopher Lloyd also joined the cast.

Principal photography began in Los Angeles in September 2019. Production moved to Winnipeg, Manitoba in October 2019. Filming lasted 34 days.

Release

Theatrical
Nobody was originally scheduled to be theatrically released in the United States on August 14, 2020, by Universal Pictures. After being repeatedly rescheduled due to the COVID-19 pandemic, the film was ultimately released in theaters on March 26, 2021. The film was released in the United Kingdom on June 9, 2021.

Home media
The film was released digitally via premium video-on-demand on April 15, 2021, on digital on June 8, 2021, and on DVD and Blu-Ray on June 22, 2021. The film became available on HBO Max on January 21, 2022.

Reception

Box office 
Nobody grossed $27.6 million in the United States and Canada, and $29.9 million in other territories, for a worldwide total of $57.5 million, against a production budget of $16 million.

A week prior to its United States release, Variety estimated the film would gross around $5 million in its opening weekend, compared to its expectation that it would open to around $15 million in a pre-COVID marketplace. The film made $2.5 million on its first day, and went on to debut to $6.7 million, topping the box office. 62% of the audience was male, with 56% being under the age of 35. The film fell 56% to $3 million in its second weekend, finishing third.

Critical response 
Review aggregator Rotten Tomatoes reports that 84% of 282 critics have given the film a positive review, with an average rating of 7/10. The website's critics consensus reads, "Nobody doesn't break any new ground for the genre, but this viscerally violent thriller smashes, shatters, and destroys plenty of other things – all while proving Bob Odenkirk has what it takes to be an action star." On Metacritic, the film has a weighted average score of 64 out of 100 based on 43 critics, indicating "generally favorable reviews." Audiences polled by CinemaScore gave the film an average grade of "A−" on an A+ to F scale, while PostTrak reported 83% of audience members gave it a positive score, with 69% saying they would definitely recommend it.

The Hollywood Reporters John DeFore praised the film's "enjoyably absurd violence," and wrote, "Taking itself much less seriously than the Taken series and its predecessors, it's a wish-fulfillment romp just as ludicrous as any of them but more fun than most." Richard Roeper of the Chicago Sun-Times gave the film 3 out of 4 stars, writing, "Most impressive of all is Odenkirk, who looks and sounds nothing like an action star until it's time for Hutch to become an action star, and we totally believe this physically unimpressive, normally mild-mannered guy as a simmering cauldron of rage who could take that teapot over there and kill ya with it."

Future

Sequel
In March 2021, Connie Nielsen expressed interest in reprising her role for a sequel. The actress stated that she would like to learn more about Hutch and Becca's backstory, while stating that discussions regarding how the two characters met took place on the set of the first movie. In June of the same year, it was announced that Kolstad was in the process of writing a sequel, although it has yet to be green-lit by the studio. In March 2022, 87North Productions announced on social media, that the studio was looking forward to working on Nobody 2 though no official production date was announced at that time. By August of the same year, Leitch confirmed that work on the script is ongoing, while stating that the studio has committed to releasing a sequel.

In December 2022, McCormick announced that a sequel was officially happening, with principal photography scheduled for 2023.

Potential crossover
In March 2021, Derek Kolstad stated that there is potential for a crossover between the John Wick franchise and Nobody as they were created by the same studio 87North Productions, despite being distributed by Lionsgate and Universal, respectively. Both were created by Kolstad and produced by Leitch, who is married to Nobody co-producer Kelly McCormick. The writer stated that he would like to see it done in a small and subtle Easter egg-reference manner, and not as a franchise cinematic universe. Later that month, director Ilya Naishuller expressed interest in a crossover. The filmmaker pointed out that 87North Productions was involved with both movies, while acknowledging that other studios were also involved saying: "I mean, everything's possible. Stranger things have definitely happened, but... yeah.”

In June of the same year, Kolstad stated that he would like to have the properties crossover in a minimalist fashion, while reaffirming that John Wick and Hutch Mansell would be on the same side should the characters share more screen time.

References

External links
 
 
 

2021 films
2021 action thriller films
American action thriller films
American black comedy films
Films about families
Films about the Russian Mafia
Films postponed due to the COVID-19 pandemic
Films scored by David Buckley
Films shot in Los Angeles
Films shot in Winnipeg
Films with screenplays by Derek Kolstad
Universal Pictures films
Films directed by Ilya Naishuller
2020s English-language films
2020s American films